The Island Garden Arena was a 5,200-seat arena in West Hempstead, New York. It was built in 1957 by Arnold "Whitey" Carlson, a descendant of Swedish immigrants. Carlson's grandfather was Henrik Carlson, a noted San Diego sculptor who was the Foreign Art Director for the San Diego Exposition (now Balboa Park). 

Over the years, concert acts such as Cream, the Dave Clark Five, Louis Armstrong, The Byrds, Sly and the Family Stone, Duke Ellington, Joan Baez, Procol Harum, and Bob Dylan performed at the venue. The Island Garden Arena also hosted boxing matches, professional wrestling, circuses, rodeos, stamp shows, midget car racing, and boat shows.

The arena hosted the New York Nets of the American Basketball Association from 1969 to 1972. The Nets were unable to play any home playoff games in 1971 because the arena was booked with other events; they played one home playoff game at Hofstra University, and two at Madison Square Garden's Felt Forum. In 1971–72, the Nets posted their first winning season, advancing all the way to the 1972 ABA Finals, where they lost to the Indiana Pacers. Late in the season, the team moved from the Island Garden into the new Nassau Coliseum. In 1976, the Nets were admitted into the National Basketball Association, moved to New Jersey, and eventually becoming today's Brooklyn Nets.

The arena was partially demolished in 1973, unable to compete with Nassau Coliseum. A shopping center was built on that portion of the site. The remaining portion of the structure was rebuilt into a youth basketball venue in 1998. It has three courts for simultaneous gameplay or practice. Today, the location of Island Garden is 45 Cherry Valley Avenue, West Hempstead.

References

See also

American Basketball Association venues
Basketball venues in New York (state)
Sports venues in Long Island
Defunct basketball venues in the United States
Defunct indoor arenas in New York (state)
Sports venues in Hempstead, New York
Sports venues in Nassau County, New York
Defunct sports venues in New York (state)
1998 establishments in New York (state)
Sports venues completed in 1998